The Battle of Mount Song, also known as the , in 1944 was part of a larger campaign in southwest China during the Second World War. Chinese Nationalist forces aimed to retake the Burma Road.

Background
The Japanese Army in Southern Yunnan was at risk of being cut off by advancing British and American troops in Northern Burma. The Japanese Army aimed to block the highway for as long as possible.  Constructing a series of tunnels and bunkers over a static two-year period they turned the mountain and its immediate environs into a fortress.  Songshan (in Chinese) Matsuyama (in Japanese) blocked the road immediately behind the Salween River. Although the Chinese Nationalist Army crossed the river with light casualties and surrounded the Japanese garrison, they found that their offensive capability was limited because of this garrison behind their line of advance.

The Chinese forces were unaware of the depth of the Japanese defences, and their underestimation led to heavy casualties through a slow and cautious campaign.  Chinese artillery strikes and US bombing runs had little effect against Japanese forces underground.  Japan also set up a series of hidden pillboxes to ambush the Chinese forces.

After three months of battle, the Chinese forces finally retook Mount Song through the use of extended bombardment and an overabundance of US aid and training, as well as several tons of U.S. TNT placed in tunnels beneath the fortifications. Once open the Burma Road could be used to supply China with aid via a land route.

Fall and Aftermath
The Japanese listed only one survivor, Captain Kinoshita, an artillery officer and one other soldier ordered out to communicate to the Japanese high command the night before the fall of the outpost, with apparently one other soldier. Chinese sources say 7 soldiers were captured out of the total garrison, Japanese sources do not mention prisoners.

Comfort Station
Upon the exhortations of Senior Staff Officer Masanobu Tsuji, a comfort station was established in early 1944.
About 12 Japanese comfort women killed themselves towards the end of the siege after fighting alongside the Japanese garrison. Another five or six Korean comfort women were captured by Chinese and US forces and eventually repatriated.

Significance
After the capture of the stronghold, the Burma Road could be used once again to supply China.

Although defeated, the small Japanese force, unsupplied and lacking air power or heavy artillery, held up the entire Chinese Expeditionary Army for over three months considerably lengthening the war in Burma.

A memorial park was built on top of the mountain by the Chinese government, with 402 sculptures representing soldiers from the Chinese Expeditionary Force spread over an area of 190000 sq. feet.

References 

Mount
1944 in China
1944 in Japan
Mount